Moniteau Township is an inactive township in Randolph County, in the U.S. state of Missouri.

Moniteau Township takes its name from Moniteau Creek.

References

Townships in Missouri
Townships in Randolph County, Missouri